Esbu Kola or Asbu Kala or Asbu Kola may refer to:
 Esbu Kola, Babol
 Esbu Kola-ye Karim Kola, Fereydunkenar County
 Esbu Kola, Sari
 Esbu Kola, Savadkuh
 Esbu Kola Rural District, in Babol County